UP Aerospace, Inc. is a private spaceflight corporation headquartered in Denver, Colorado.  UP Aerospace provides sub-orbital transportation for corporate, military and educational payloads, via their SpaceLoft XL sounding rocket launch vehicles.

History and future plans 

UP Aerospace was started in 1998 by Jerry Larson, an aerospace engineer who had long been involved in the space program as an employee of Lockheed Martin. Larson was also a member of the Civilian Space eXploration Team (CSXT), which in 2004 became the first amateur organization to launch a (suborbital) rocket into space. The company was incorporated in 2004.

The first launch of the SpaceLoft XL occurred on September 25, 2006 from Spaceport America in Upham, New Mexico. The vehicle failed to go higher than 40,000 ft due to a malfunction attributed to faulty fin design and unexpected aerodynamic effects.

UP Aerospace conducted eight launches from Spaceport America during 2006–2009, including three in 2009.
They plan to "double the number of customer launches from Spaceport America to six or more in 2010 as demand for the company's services increases."

As of November 2015 the company is developing an orbital small satellite launch vehicle known as Spyder, with support from NASA.

On July 31, 2018 UP Aerospace announced it had been awarded a 5-year IDIQ launch contract by NASA under Flight Opportunities Program. The contract calls for UP Aerospace to conduct suborbital rocket flights for NASA using its SpaceLoft XL rocket. This was the third contract of this type awarded to UP Aerospace by NASA. UP Aerospace had conducted, up to 31 July 2018, 7 launches for NASA under the Flight Opportunities program since 2012.

Launches

Completed Launches 
As of 23 November 2019, UP Aerospace has made 18 launches, including 13 with the SpaceLoft XL rocket. Most launches have been successful. All launches have been suborbital and all launches have taken place from Spaceport America.

Maiden launch of SpaceLoft XL took place on 25 September 2006.

On April 28, 2007, some of the cremated remains of actor James Doohan, who played Chief Engineer Scott on the 1960s television series Star Trek, and from astronaut Gordon Cooper, were rocketed into suborbital space (along with  ashes of about 200 other people) by UP Aerospace from Spaceport America.  This was the first successful launch from the site. The payload container was recovered 18 May 2007.

By August 2007, UP Aerospace began offering low-cost launches to youth and students through the Space Generation Advisory Council for as low as US$2,000 per experiment. From 2008, the Space Generation Advisory Council hosted a range of competitions for youth to address specific technical or logistical challenges through the design of their own UP Aerospace TinySat module.

In April 2008, UP Aerospace was hired by the large US aerospace company Lockheed Martin to provide launch services at Spaceport America for a test rocket program. Lockheed Martin stated that they are trying to create a lower-cost-to-orbit cargo service, using a winged vehicle launched atop a land-based rocket. UP Aerospace and the New Mexico location were chosen to aid in testing prototype systems. UP Aerospace was chosen, particularly, because of their experience launching rockets at Spaceport America.

UP Aerospace conducted their 6th sub-orbital launch on April 5, 2012. Called SpaceLoft 6, it was contracted by the Department of Defense (ORS) office.  The vehicle also carried on board an experiment from NASA's Flight Opportunities Program. The Spaceloft XL rocket launch set a new Spaceport America record at the time, reaching an altitude of 385,640 feet.

UP Aerospace SL-7 launch took place on June 21, 2013.  The vehicle carried 7 payloads for NASA's Flight Opportunities Program and the cremated remains for 39 individuals. This successful flight reached an altitude of 73.9 miles. All payloads were recovered on White Sands Range.

UP Aerospace SL-8 launch on November 12 took place at Spaceport America and reached 385,000 feet. On board were experiments sponsored by NASA's Flight Opportunities Program. Brian Barnett, Satwest President, led a team of Albuquerque students that sent the first commercial text messages to space using a Satwest satellite phone inside one of eight payloads carried by the SL-8. This technology has later been incorporated into Solstar Space. SpaceLoft XL 8 was the second fully manifested launch for the Flight Opportunities Program.

UP Aerospace SL-9 took place at Spaceport America on October 23, 2014. After a 3-day weather hold, the rocket was launched reaching 408,035 feet (77.25 miles). The NASA Flight Opportunities supported Launch Carried 4 Technology Payloads. Also on board were cremations of 30 individuals provided through Celestis memorial spaceflights as well as an experiment from a private company.

UP Aerospace SL-10 mission launched on November 6, 2015 from Spaceport America. The SpaceLoft XL suborbital sounding rocket carried four technology experiments for NASA's Flight Opportunities Program to an altitude of approximately 75 miles (120 km). For the first time for UP Aerospace the payload experiments were separated from the rocket for an independent re-entry and were recovered 30 miles downrange after parachuting down individually.

UP Aerospace SL-12 mission launched on September 12, 2018 from Spaceport America. The SpaceLoft XL suborbital sounding rocket carried three technology demonstration payloads for NASA's Flight Opportunities Program. The payloads were an umbrella-like heat shield called Adaptable Deployable Entry and Placement Technology (ADEPT), the Suborbital Flight Environment Monitor (SFEM-3) and the Autonomous Flight Termination System (AFTS). Reached an altitude of 114 km (70.84 miles).

UP Aerospace SL-11 mission was launched on September 17, 2018 from Spaceport America, just five days after the previous flight. The SpaceLoft XL suborbital sounding rocket carried technology demonstration payloads for NASA's Flight Opportunities Program. Also on-board was Celestis-15 Starseeker. Reached an altitude of 114 km (70.84 miles).

UP Aerospace SL-14 mission was launched on November 22, 2019 from Spaceport America. The SpaceLoft XL suborbital sounding rocket carried payloads for NASA's Flight Opportunities Program. Reached an altitude of 92 km (57 mi).

Future Launches 
UP Aerospace has plans for future launches with a number of their clients.

On November 29, 2022 it was announced that they would be flying Celestis' 19th mission. They are using the SpaceLoft XL suborbital sounding rocket as the vehicle. A launch is planned to take place Wednesday, November 30, 2022; however, it was scrubbed Tuesday night with plans to launch Thursday, December 1, 2022 instead. As of 10 January 2023, the launch has not happened.

Products
SpaceLoft XL sounding rocket

See also
List of UP Aerospace launches

References

External links
UPaerospace Aerospace features video of space launches including onboard footage

Private spaceflight companies
Farmington, Connecticut
Companies established in 2004
Companies based in Colorado
2004 establishments in Colorado